Vîn TV is a satellite television channel founded in 2007. Broadcasting from Duhok Province in Kurdistan Region, Iraq, it is now considered one of the most popular Kurdish music channels in the world. Boasting over 150 artists signed so far they have contributed significantly to the Kurdish music scene for Kurds around the world. It broadcasts Kurdish music and cultural programs, 24 hours a day. The name Vîn in Kurdish means Love.

Vin TV is a subsidiary company of Vin Group. Vin Group includes Vin TV (satellite), Vin Productions (music production/distribution), NV (video production), Vin FM (radio), and Next Generation Communications (NGC, a mobile value added service subsidiary).

Vin Group was founded by Sarkat Junad Rekani and Kawa Junad Rekani. Sarkat Junad Rekani is sitting CEO and Kawa Junad Rekani is chairman.

External links
 
VinTV on YouTube
 Next Generation Communications (NGC)

Television stations in Kurdistan Region (Iraq)
Television stations in Iraq
Kurdish-language television stations
Mass media in Duhok